Lithophane bethunei, or Bethune's pinion, is a species of cutworm or dart moth in the family Noctuidae. It is found in North America.

The MONA or Hodges number for Lithophane bethunei is 9887.

References

Further reading

External links

 

bethun
Articles created by Qbugbot
Moths described in 1868